Jalingo is the capital city of Taraba State in north eastern Nigeria , named in fulfulde (The word jalingo means "superior place") and has been estimated with population of 418,000. and the city is mainly dominated by Fulanis and others small ethnic groups.

Fulfulde, Mumuye, Hausa and many other local languages are spoken in Jalingo. Location of the Muri, Nigeria Emirate and palace of the empire of Jalingo, a town founded during the muslim jihad era.

Caretaker chairman 
Each local government in Nigeria is governed by caretaker chairmen. They are the one that run the affairs of the state.

The elected Chairman of Jalingo during the last election in 2020 was Hon. Abdulnaseer Bobboji of People Democratic Party (PDP). He had been the Caretaker Chairman until when his tenure ended up on Sunday, 3rd July, 2022. Following that, the Taraba state Governor, Arch. Darius Dickson Ishaku appointed the former Taraba Primary Health Care Development  Agency Executive Secretary, Alh. Aminu Jauro as the caretaker Chairman of Jalingo.

Market 
Jalingo as the capital city of Taraba state has many markets, but the major recognized markets are:

 Jalingo Main Market
 Kasuwan Yelwa (Yelwa Market)

See also
Federal Medical Centre, Jalingo
Taraba State University

References

Local Government Areas in Taraba State
State capitals in Nigeria

External links

 meaning of the word Jalingo in fulfulde 
Muri EMirate history in Jalingo